The  Ministry of Economic Development is a Cabinet department in the Executive branch of the Republic of Bashkortostan  government.

Notes and references

External links
 Republic of Bashkortostan Ministry of Economic Development Official Website in Russian
Politics of Bashkortostan
Government ministries of Bashkortostan
Bashkortostan